Catterns is a surname. Notable people with the surname include:

 Angela Catterns (born 1953), Australian media personality and broadcaster
 Basil Catterns (1917–2007), Australian businessman, soldier, and yachtsman
 Basil G. Catterns (1886–1969), chief cashier of the Bank of England